Chullpani (Aymara chullpa an ancient funerary building, -ni a suffix to indicate ownership, "the one with chullpa constructions") is a  mountain in the Andes of Bolivia. It is located in the Cochabamba Department, Mizque Province, Mizque Municipality.

References

Mountains of Cochabamba Department